Munich Airport Terminal station is a Munich S-Bahn terminal station at Munich Airport at the end of the Munich East–Munich Airport railway. The ride takes approximately 45 minutes to the Marienplatz station in the city centre.

Munich Airport station is located in a tunnel beneath the central area. A second station, Besucherpark (Visitors' Park) connects the cargo and maintenance areas, long-term parking, administrative buildings and the name-giving Visitors' Park.

A second tunnel beneath the terminals is currently unused. Originally, there were plans to use it for intercity railway, then for a Transrapid maglev train making the trip to München Hauptbahnhof in 10 minutes. However, this project was cancelled in March 2008 due to cost escalation.

Operations 
Munich Airport Terminal station is served by the following regional and S-Bahn services:

Regional services

S-Bahn services

Bus services

References

Munich S-Bahn stations
Airport railway stations in Germany
Railway stations located underground in Germany
Railway stations in Germany opened in 1992
Buildings and structures in Freising (district)